Long Valley may refer to:

Long Valley Caldera in California
Long Valley, Lassen County, California
Long Valley, California, former name of Greenwood, El Dorado County, California
Long Valley, Hong Kong 
Long Valley, New Jersey
Long Valley, South Dakota
Long Valley, Hampshire, England
Long Valley (Lake County, California)
Long Valley (Nevada)
Long Valley (Kane County, Utah), stretching along US-89 from Long Valley Junction (SR-14) south to Mt. Carmel Junction (SR-9)